John Rutherford (1 August 1695 – 6 March 1779, Edinburgh) was a Scottish physician and professor at the University of Edinburgh Medical School. He is the father of the scientist Daniel Rutherford and the grandfather of the writer Walter Scott.

Rutherford was one of the eminent physicians of his time. He taught at the University of Edinburgh, which was one of the world's leading medical schools in the 18th century. He was one of the founding professors of the University of Edinburgh Medical School and was appointed the Professor of Practice of Medicine from 1726 to 1765. Rutherford was a Fellow of the Royal College of Physicians of Edinburgh.

He is probably best known for pioneering clinical teaching, which meant that students were learning in the hospital with live patients rather than receiving classroom teaching. This method was first introduced by Herman Boerhaave at University of Leiden and soon after used at the University of Edinburgh as well. However, its early deployment was somewhat limited since the university only had a small ward and hence only a few patients available for clinical teaching. In 1741 the new Royal Infirmary with 228 beds was opened, and in 1748 John Rutherford started to provide clinical teaching to all his students. These lessons proved to be extremely popular and soon became a compulsory part of the medical education.

Two manuscript copies of early clinical lectures given by Rutherford on the wards of the Edinburgh Royal Infirmary survive as part of the Manchester Medical Manuscripts Collection held by special collections at the University of Manchester.

Notes

References
 John Rutherford in the genealogy database Family Ghosts of the Stanford University
Helen M. Dingwall: A History of Scottish Medicine: Themes and Influences. Edinburgh University Press 2003,  (restricted online version (Google Books))
M.H. Kaufman: 500 years of the College of Surgeons and 300 years of the Chair of Anatomy in Edinburgh.  The Surgeon. June 2005 Vol 3 No 3.

18th-century Scottish medical doctors
Academics of the University of Edinburgh
People from Selkirk, Scottish Borders
Alumni of the University of Edinburgh
Leiden University alumni
Reims University (1548–1793) alumni
Scottish pharmacologists
Burials at Greyfriars Kirkyard
1695 births
1779 deaths